1576 Fabiola, provisional designation , is a Themistian asteroid from the outer regions of the asteroid belt, approximately 27 kilometers in diameter. It was discovered on 30 September 1948, by Belgian astronomer Sylvain Arend at the Royal Observatory of Belgium in Uccle. The asteroid was named after Queen Fabiola of Belgium.

Orbit and classification 

Fabiola is a Themistian asteroid that belongs to the Themis family, a very large family of carbonaceous asteroids, named after 24 Themis. It orbits the Sun in the outer main-belt at a distance of 2.6–3.7 AU once every 5 years and 7 months (2,042 days). Its orbit has an eccentricity of 0.17 and an inclination of 1° with respect to the ecliptic.

Physical characteristics 

In the Tholen classification, Fabiola has an ambiguous spectral type, similar to the B-type asteroids ("bright" carbonaceous asteroids), yet with an "unusual" spectra (BU).

Rotation period 

In November 1976, a rotational lightcurve of Fabiola was obtained from photometric observations by Swedish astronomer Claes-Ingvar Lagerkvist at Uppsala Observatory. Lightcurve analysis gave a rotation period of 6.7 hours with a brightness amplitude of 0.2 magnitude.

Diameter and albedo 

According to the surveys carried out by the Infrared Astronomical Satellite IRAS, the Japanese Akari satellite and the NEOWISE mission of NASA's Wide-field Infrared Survey Explorer, Fabiola measures between 21.33 and 30.150 kilometers in diameter and its surface has an albedo between 0.0746 and 0.123.

The Collaborative Asteroid Lightcurve Link adopts the results obtained by IRAS, that is, an albedo of 0.0913 and a diameter of 27.25 kilometers based on an absolute magnitude of 11.04.

Naming 

This minor planet was named after Queen Fabiola of Belgium (1928–2014). The official  was published by the Minor Planet Center on 31 January 1962.

References

External links 
 Asteroid Lightcurve Database (LCDB), query form (info )
 Dictionary of Minor Planet Names, Google books
 Asteroids and comets rotation curves, CdR – Observatoire de Genève, Raoul Behrend
 Discovery Circumstances: Numbered Minor Planets (1)-(5000) – Minor Planet Center
 
 

001576
Discoveries by Sylvain Arend
Fabiola
001576
19480930